Francis Higgins may refer to:

Francis Peter Higgins (athlete) (1928–1993), British athlete who competed in the 1956 Summer Olympics
Francis Higgins (soccer), U.S. soccer goalkeeper
Francis Higgins (cyclist) (1882–1948), British Olympic cyclist who competed in the 1912 Summer Olympics
 Francis Higgins (priest), 18th century Anglican clergyman
Francis "The Viper" Higgins, a character in the Irish comedy series Hardy Bucks

See also
 Frank Higgins (disambiguation)